The Sama–Bajaw languages are a well established group of languages spoken by the Sama-Bajau peoples of the Philippines, Indonesia and Malaysia. They are mainly spoken on Borneo and the Sulu Archipelago between Borneo and Mindanao.

Languages
Grimes (2003) identifies nine Sama–Bajaw languages. 
Balangingi (Bangingi'; Northern Sama)
Central Sama (Siasa Sama)
Southern Sama (Sinama)
Pangutaran Sama
Mapun (Kagayan)
Yakan
Abaknon (Inabaknon)
Indonesian Bajau
West Coast Bajau

The first six are spoken in the Sulu region of the Southern Philippines. Indonesian Bajaw is spoken mainly in Sulawesi and West Coast Bajaw in Sabah, Borneo. Several dialects of the languages can be identified.

Blust (2006) states that lexical evidence indicates that Sama–Bajaw originated in the Barito region of southeast Borneo, though not from any established group of Barito languages. Ethnologue has followed, calling the resulting group 'Greater Barito'.

Classification
Pallesen (1985:18) classifies the Sama-Bajaw languages as follows.

Sama-Bajaw
Abaknon
Yakan: Northern Yakan, Southern Yakan
Sibuguey (Sama Batuan)
Sulu-Borneo
Western Sulu: Sama Pangutaran, Sama Ubian
Inner Sulu
Northern Sulu: Tagtabun Balangingiq, Tongquil Balangingiq, Linungan, Panigayan Balangingiq, Landang-Guaq, Mati, Sama Daongdong, Kawit Balangingiq, Karundung, Pilas
Central Sulu: Sama Kaulungan, Sama Dilaut, Sama Kabingan, Sama Musuq, Sama Laminusa, Sama Balimbing, Sama Bannaran, Sama Bangaw-Bangaw, South Ubian
Southern Sulu: Sama Tanduq-baas, Sama Simunul, Sama Pahut, Sama Sibutuq, Sama Sampulnaq
Sama Lutangan, Sama Sibukuq
Borneo Coast
Jama Mapun
Sabah Land Bajaw: Kota Belud Bajaw, Kawang Bajaw, Papar Bajaw, Banggi Bajaw, Putatan Bajaw
Indonesian Bajaw: Sulamu, Kajoa, Roti, Jaya Bakti, Poso, Togian 1, Wallace, Togian 2, Minahasa

Grammar

Voice 
Western Austronesian languages are characterised by symmetrical voice alternations. These differ from asymmetrical voice alternations, such as active and passive, since the voices can be considered equally transitive. Hence, the terms Actor Voice and Undergoer Voice are sometimes used. 
 Actor Voice (AV) refers to the construction in which the actor or agent-like argument is mapped to subject. 
 Undergoer Voice (UV) refers to the construction in which the undergoer or patient-like argument is mapped to subject. 
The voice construction is signalled through morphological marking on the verb.

Western Austronesian languages are typically subdivided into Philippine-type and Indonesian-type languages on the basis of the voice system:

The voice alternations in Sama–Bajaw languages have some characteristics of Philippine-type languages and some characteristics of Indonesian-type languages.

Miller (2014) says that there are three main voice alternations in Sama-Bajaw:
 An Actor Voice (AV) construction marked with a nasal prefix
 A transitive non-AV construction with the bare verb
 Another non-AV construction with morphological marking on the verb and case marking on the agent
In many Philippine languages, the UV construction is said to be basic. This has led people to analyse the languages as syntactically ergative. This analysis has been proposed for Sama Southern (Trick 2006); Yakan (Brainard & Behrens 2002); Sama Bangingi’ (Gault 1999) and Sama Pangutaran (Walton 1986). These languages are said to have Philippine-type voice systems.

West Coast Bajau, however, is said to have an Indonesian-type voice system because there are two transitive voices; a true passive construction (-in-) and an applicative suffix (-an). This makes West Coast Bajau more similar to the languages of Sarawak and Kalimantan than the other languages of Sabah.

Indonesian Bajau also has an Indonesian-type voice system as illustrated below:

In some Sama-Bajau languages there are restrictions on how the non-AV actor is realised. For example, in Sama Bangingi’ the non-AV actor is typically a pronominal clitic in first or second person.

The voice alternations in Sama-Bajau languages can also be accompanied by a change in the case-marking of pronouns and a change in word-order.

Case marking 
Sama-Bajau languages do not have case-marking on nominal arguments.

Nonetheless, pronouns have different forms depending on their grammatical function. Like the languages of Sarawak, West Coast Bajau has two different pronoun sets:
 Set 1: non-subject actors
 Set 2: all other pronouns
In contrast, most of the languages of Sabah have three sets of pronouns:
 Set 1: non-subject actors
 Set 2: subjects
 Set 3: non-subject, non-actors
In West Coast Bajau, the non-subject undergoer can be optionally realised using both the Set 1 and the Set 2 pronouns.

Zero anaphora is possible for highly topical arguments, except the UV actor, which cannot be deleted. This is common across Western Austronesian languages.

Word order 
Like the languages of the Philippines, the Sama–Bajaw languages in the Sulu tend to be verb-initial. However, in most languages word order is flexible and depends on the voice construction. In the Sulu, SVO is only found in the context of preposed negatives and aspect markers. In West Coast Bajau, on the other hand, SVO word-order is also found in pragmatically neutral contexts. This, again, makes West Coast Bajau more similar to the languages of Sarawak than the other languages of the Sama-Bajaw group.

Verheijen (1986) suggests that the Bajau language spoken in the Lesser Sunda Islands has no fixed position of the subject but is fixed VO. The language has several properties that are said to correlate with VO word-order: 
 Prepositions
 Noun‑Genitive
 Noun-Relative
 Noun-Adjective
 Noun-Demonstrative
 Preverbal negatives
 Initial subordinators
The preferred word-orders for five Sama-Bajau languages are shown below. The word order is represented in terms of the semantic roles: actor (A) and undergoer (U).

In all Sama-Bajau languages, the position of the actor is fixed, directly following the verb in the zero UV construction. Elsewhere, the order of actor and undergoer depends on the animacy of the arguments. This could be seen to follow the Philippine tendency to place actors first in the clause.

If we rephrase these orders in terms of grammatical function, a number of Sama-Bajau languages could be said to be VOS languages. S is equivalent to the actor in AV and the undergoer in UV. O is equivalent to the non-subject core argument.

Word order and information structure 
Variant word-orders are permitted in Sama-Bajau languages. The different word-orders have different information structure interpretations. This differs depending on the voice of the clause.

Miller (2007) suggests that verb-initial order in West Coast Bajau UV clauses strongly correlates with foregrounding. He argues that this is the basic word order given that the undergoer in final position does not have a specific pragmatic status. In contrast, fronted undergoers are highly active and accessible. Both SVO and VOS orders occur with equal frequency in narrative texts, though VOS is highly preferred in foregrounded clauses.

AV clauses are predominantly subject-initial regardless of grounding. In fact, SVO is the only word-order permitted in subordinate clauses. Where verb-initial clauses in AV do occur, however, they typically represent key sequences of action in the storyline.

There are also specificity effects in AV verb-initial word order. VOS is acceptable when the non-subject undergoer is non-specific, but sometimes considered unacceptable if the undergoer is specific. The same is true for definite undergoers. However, the effects are not found when the word-order is VSO and the undergoer is in final position. In this case, the structure is grammatical regardless of whether the undergoer is definite/specific or not.

Topic and focus 
In West Coast Bajau, it is possible for subjects, obliques and adjuncts to appear pre-verbally. Only non-subject arguments cannot appear in this position. Miller (2007: 193) suggests that there are two positions pre-verbally: topic and focus. Topic represents presupposed information whilst focus represents new information. In both AV and UV clauses, the preverbal subjects can be either topic or focus. Obliques, on the other hand, are always focus.

Consequently, Miller (2007: 211) analyses the clause structure of West Coast Bajau as follows:

Pragmatic structure of West Coast Bajau

The preverbal focus position can be followed by focus particles such as no.

Reconstruction
Proto-Sama-Bajaw is reconstructed in Pallesen (1985). Pallesen (1985) considers the homeland of Proto-Sama-Bajaw to be in the Basilan Strait area, around 800 AD.

References

Blench, Roger. 2016. The linguistic background to SE Asian sea nomadism. In Sea nomads of SE Asia past and present. Bérénice Bellina, Roger M. Blench & Jean-Christophe Galipaud eds. Singapore: NUS Press.
Pallesen, A. Kemp. 1985. Culture contact and language convergence. Philippine journal of linguistics: special monograph issue, 24. Manila: Linguistic Society of the Philippines.

 
Barito languages
Languages of Indonesia
Languages of the Philippines